Lumla is one of the 60 assembly constituencies of  Arunachal Pradesh a north east state of India. It is part of Arunachal East Lok Sabha constituency.

Boundaries
As per Delimitation Commission of India report 2008, No 1 Lumla(ST) consists of Lumla circle excluding villages Bongleng and Kharung, Zemithang circle and Kudung, Pamaghar, Sakpret and Thongleng villages of Tawang Circle.

Members of Legislative Assembly
 1978: Karma Wangchu, Independent
 1980: Karma Wangchu, People's Party of Arunachal
 1984: Karma Wangchu, Indian National Congress
 1990: Karma Wangchu, Indian National Congress
 1995: T.G. Rinpoche, Independent
 1999: T.G. Rinpoche, Indian National Congress
 2004: T.G. Rinpoche, Indian National Congress
 2009: Jambey Tashi, Indian National Congress
 2014: Jambey Tashi, Indian National Congress

Election results

2019

See also

 Tawang district
 List of constituencies of Arunachal Pradesh Legislative Assembly

References

Assembly constituencies of Arunachal Pradesh
Tawang district